Yakubu Abubakar Akilu  (born 14 March 1989) is a Nigerian footballer who plays as a defensive midfielder for Västerhaninge IF.

Career
A pacy young midfielder who scored many goals for Ebedei, he was the ninth player who moved from the club to Midtjylland. He played the 2009–10 season for FC Hjørring, on loan from Midtjylland. On 22 December 2010, Akilu left Kolding FC and signed for FC Fredericia.

In June 2018, Akilu joined Swedish club KSF Prespa Birlik. He would later play lower-level football in Sweden for Rågsveds IF and Västerhaninge IF.

References

1989 births
Living people
Nigerian footballers
FC Midtjylland players
Vendsyssel FF players
Danish Superliga players
Danish 1st Division players
Nigerian expatriate footballers
Expatriate men's footballers in Denmark
Nigerian expatriate sportspeople in Denmark
Expatriate footballers in Sweden
Nigerian expatriate sportspeople in Sweden
FC Fredericia players
Sportspeople from Ogun State
F.C. Ebedei players
KSF Prespa Birlik players
Association football midfielders